Jakub Hrůša (born 23 July 1981 in Brno), is a Czech conductor.

Education
Hrůša is the son of the architect Petr Hrůša.  Hrůša studied piano and trombone, and developed an interest in conducting, during his years at Gymnázium třída Kapitána Jaroše in Brno.  Later he studied conducting at the Academy of Performing Arts in Prague, where his teachers included Jiří Bělohlávek, Radomil Eliška and Leoš Svárovský. In 2000 he participated in the Prague Spring International Music Festival conducting competition.  In 2003, he was a prizewinner in the International Competition of Young Conductors Lovro von Matačić in Zagreb, Croatia.  He has researched for a dissertation the work of contemporary Czech composers.

Career
From 2002 to 2005, Hrůša was Associate Conductor with the Czech Philharmonic.  From 2005 to 2006, he was an associate conductor with the Orchestre Philharmonique de Radio France. In April 2006, he signed a six-CD recording contract with Supraphon, where the first three CDs were with the Prague Philharmonia.

From 2005 to 2008, Hrůša was principal guest conductor of the Prague Philharmonia.  He was the orchestra's chief conductor from 2008 to 2015.  From 2005 to 2006, he was the Chief Conductor of the Bohuslav Martinů Philharmonic in Zlín.  He became principal guest conductor of the Czech Philharmonic Orchestra as of the 2015–2016 season.

In February 2009, Hrůša was named the music director of Glyndebourne on Tour, effective January 2010.  In September 2011, he was named the next music director of the Royal Danish Opera and of the Royal Danish Orchestra, effective September 2013.  However, in January 2012, in the wake of the resignation of Keith Warner from the artistic directorship of the Royal Danish Opera following proposed budget cuts, Hrůša announced that he would not take the music directorship of Royal Danish Opera, in solidarity with Warner's action. In September 2015, after 5 appearances as a guest conductor, Hrůša was named the next chief conductor of the Bamberg Symphony, effective from the 2016–2017 season, with an initial contract of 4 seasons.  In March 2017, the Philharmonia Orchestra announced the appointment of Hrůša as one of its two new principal guest conductors, effective with the 2017–2018 season.  In June 2018, the Bamberg Symphony announced the extension of Hrůša's contract as its chief conductor through the 2025–2026 season.  In July 2021, the Orchestra dell'Accademia Nazionale di Santa Cecilia announced the appointment of Hrůša as its next principal guest conductor, effective with the 2021-2022 season, with an initial contract of 3 seasons.

Hrůša first guest-conducted at the Royal Opera House (ROH) in February 2018, in a production of Carmen.  He returned to the ROH in April 2022 to conduct a production of Lohengrin.  In October 2022, the ROH announced the appointment of Hrůša as its next music director, effective in September 2025.  He took the title of music director designate with immediate effect.

Personal life
Hrůša and his wife Klára Hrůšová have two children.  The family have a residence in London.

Selected discography 
 Dvořák – Czech Suite, Valčíky, Polonéza.  Prague Philharmonia.  Supraphon SU 3867-2 (2006).
 Dvořák – Suite in A, op 98b; Josef Suk – Serenade for Strings, Fantastic Scherzo.  Prague Philharmonia.  Supraphon SU 3882-2 (2006).
 Dvořák – Serenade for Strings, Serenade for Winds, Meditations on the St Wenceslas Chorale.  Prague Philharmonia.  Supraphon SU 3932-2 (2008).
 Leoš Janáček – Lachian Dances, The Cunning Little Vixen Suite (František Jílek version), Taras Bulba.  Brno Philharmonic.  Supraphon SU 3923-2 (2009).
 Bohuslav Martinů, Josef Bohuslav Foerster, Viteszlav Novak – Cello Concertos.  Jiří Bárta, Prague Philharmonia.  Supraphon SU 3989-2 (2009).
 Bedřich Smetana – Ma Vlast.  Prague Philharmonia.  Supraphon SU 4032-2 (2010).
 Dvořák & Lalo – Cello Concertos. Johannes Moser, Prague Philharmonia. Pentatone PTC 5186488 (2015)
 Dvořák – Slavonic Rhapsodies & Symphonic Variations.  Prague Philharmonia. Pentatone PTC 5186554 (2016)
 Dvořák – Overtures. Prague Philharmonia. Pentatone PTC 5186532 (2016).
 Bartok & Kodaly – Concertos for Orchestra. Rundfunk-Sinfonieorchester Berlin. Pentatone PTC 5186626 (2018).

References

External links
 Bamberg Symphony English-language page on Jakub Hrůša
 Supraphon Czech-language page on Jakub Hrůša
 Supraphon English-language page on Jakub Hrůša
 IMG Artists agency page on Jakub Hrůša

1981 births
Czech conductors (music)
Deutsche Grammophon artists
Male conductors (music)
Living people
Musicians from Brno
21st-century conductors (music)
21st-century Czech male musicians